Angela Gilmour (née Piggford, born 17 August 1963) is a female English former track and field athlete who competed in the 400 metres and the 4 x 400 metres relay. In the relay, she represented Great Britain at the 1988 Olympic Games in Seoul, South Korea, while at the Commonwealth Games, she won a silver medal in Edinburgh 1986 and a gold medal in Auckland 1990.

Career
Piggford was born in Gateshead, County Durham, England and was a member of Gateshead Harriers. In 1986, she represented England at the Commonwealth Games in Edinburgh, reaching the final of the 400 metres, finishing eighth in 53.97 secs, before teaming up with Jane Parry, Linda Keough and Kathy Cook, to win a silver medal in the 4x400 metres relay in 3:32.82.

In 1988, Piggford earned late selection for the 4 × 400 m relay squad for the 1988 Seoul Olympics. She didn't compete in the heats but came in as a replacement for Janet Smith for the final. The British quartet of Linda Keough, Jennifer Stoute, Piggford and Sally Gunnell, finished sixth in 3:26.89.

Piggford had some of her best results indoors, including reaching the 400 metres final at the European Indoor Championships in both 1989 and 1990. At The Hague in 1989, she was fourth in an indoor best time of 52.90. In Glasgow in 1990, she was fifth. She also competed at the 1989 World Indoor Championships in Budapest.

In January 1990, Piggford competed at her second Commonwealth Games in Auckland. In the 400 metres final, she finished fifth in 53.45. In the 4 × 400 m relay, along with Stoute, Gunnell and Keough, she won a gold medal in 3:28.08. At the European Championships in Split, she ran 53.00 to reach the semi-finals of the 400 metres. She ran in the heats of the 4 x 400 metres relay. The British quartet went on to win a bronze medal in the final with Sally Gunnell replacing Piggford. This would be her final appearance at a major championships.

Piggford won both the UK title and the AAAs Indoor title in 1986. Her lifetime best in the 400 metres is 52.79, achieved in Edinburgh on 2 July 1989. Her indoor best of 52.90 at The Hague in 1989, ranked her third on the UK all-time indoor list at the time, behind Sally Gunnell and Verona Elder. As of 2013, the time still ranks her in the UK indoor all-time top twenty.

National titles
AAA Championships 400 metres 2nd (1986) & 3rd (1989)
UK National 400 metres Champion (1986) 2nd (1985, 1988, 1989)
AAA Indoor Championships 400 metres Champion (1986) 3rd (1989)

International competitions

(#) Indicates overall position in qualifying heats (h) or semifinals (sf).

References

External links

1963 births
Living people
Athletes (track and field) at the 1988 Summer Olympics
Athletes (track and field) at the 1986 Commonwealth Games
Athletes (track and field) at the 1990 Commonwealth Games
Commonwealth Games gold medallists for England
Commonwealth Games silver medallists for England
English female sprinters
Olympic athletes of Great Britain
Commonwealth Games medallists in athletics
Olympic female sprinters
Medallists at the 1986 Commonwealth Games
Medallists at the 1990 Commonwealth Games